is a Japanese actress from Tokyo, noted for her multiple tokusatsu heroine roles in the 1980s. She is married to Yu Tokita, her co-star in Kagaku Sentai Dynaman.

Filmography

References

External links
 Sayoko Hagiwara blog

1962 births
Living people
Actresses from Tokyo
Japanese film actresses
Japanese television actresses
20th-century Japanese actresses
21st-century Japanese actresses